North Carolina Highway 35 (NC 35) is a primary state highway in the U.S. state of North Carolina.

Route description
Starting from its southern terminus at NC 305/NC 561 near Tri-County Airport in Mintons Store of western Hertford County, the route immediately enters Northampton County as it progresses northward. In the town of Woodland, NC 35 joins US 258 as Woodland's main street, before turning north again only a couple city blocks later. The road continues north through the towns of Conway and Severn before it turns into Virginia State Route 35 at the Virginia state line. Much of the route runs mostly parallel to the North Carolina and Virginia Railroad and crosses it several times.

History
Originally, NC 35 was created around 1930 as the route that present-day NC 45 follows from US 13 to US 17. However, Virginia renumbered its routes in 1940, and North Carolina followed suit to remain consistent.

Major intersections

See also
 North Carolina Bicycle Route 4 – concurrent with NC 35 through Severn

References

External links

 
 NCRoads.com: N.C. 35

035
Transportation in Hertford County, North Carolina
Transportation in Northampton County, North Carolina